Reginald Holloway (31 October 1904 – 12 February 1979) was an English cricketer. He played for Gloucestershire between 1923 and 1926.

References

External links

1904 births
1979 deaths
English cricketers
Gloucestershire cricketers
People from Dursley
Sportspeople from Gloucestershire